Pázmáneum is a university in Vienna founded as a theological seminary by Péter Pázmány in 1623.

Pazmaneum may also refer to
 Pázmány Péter Catholic University, founded in Hungary in 1635. It is the legal successor of part of the school founded by Péter Pázmány in Nagyszombat
 Eötvös Loránd University, the legal successor of the rest of the Nagyszombat university, also known as the University of Budapest, and Péter Pázmány University from 1921 to 1950
 Several different educational institutions founded by Archbishop Péter Pázmány (1570–1637)